Veliko Polje, a Slavic toponym meaning "large field", may refer to:

 Veliko Polje, Slovenia, a village near Sežana, Slovenia
 Veliko Polje, Zagreb, a village south of Zagreb, Croatia
 Veliko Polje, Virovitica-Podravina County, a village near Lukač, Croatia
 Veliko Polje (Obrenovac), a village in Serbia